Netiva Ben Yehuda (July 1928, Tel Aviv – 28 February 2011) was an Israeli author, editor and media personality. She was a commander in the pre-state Jewish underground Palmach.

Biography
Netiva ("Tiva") Ben-Yehuda was born in Tel Aviv, in Mandate Palestine, on 26 July 1928. Her father was Baruch Ben-Yehuda, director general of the first Israeli ministry of education.

Ben-Yehuda joined the Palmach at the age of 18 and was trained in demolition, bomb disposal, topography, and scouting. Her duties included transferring ammunition, escorting convoys, and training recruits.

The Palmach generally opposed women fighting at the front, however Ben-Yehuda was a commander and participated in several battles by performing sabotage operations. On February 11, 1948, Ben-Yehuda and her comrades planted a mine for a busload of Arabs. This event and the ensuing death impacted Ben-Yehuda psychologically.

Ben-Yehuda considered competing in discus throwing at the Olympics, but a bullet injury to her arm kept her from pursuing an athletic career. She studied at the Bezalel Academy of Art and Design in Jerusalem and Jewish philosophy at the Hebrew University of Jerusalem.

Ben Yehuda worked as a freelance editor, and in 1972 published The World Dictionary of Hebrew Slang. Between 1981 and 1991, she published her Palmah trilogy, a series of three novels based on her own experience in the War of Independence (see "Published works"). She wrote over 30 books, including a Hebrew slang dictionary, coauthored with Dahn Ben-Amotz.

She was the host of a late-night Israel Radio show for 14 years where she played old-time Israeli songs and spoke with callers. She was a resident of Palmach Street in the capital, and the local cafe she patronized on that street became known as "Cafe Netiva."

Ben Yehuda died on 28 February 2011 at the age of 82.

Awards and honours
In 2004, Ben Yehuda received the Yakir Yerushalayim (Worthy Citizen of Jerusalem) award from the city of Jerusalem.

Quote
On the subject of the Palmach: "I don't think that there has ever been any other underground movement in the world in which 'male chauvinism' triumphed so powerfully and so proudly".

Published works
 The World Dictionary of Hebrew Slang (with Dahn Ben Amotz), Zmora Bitan, 1972 [Ha-Milon Le-Ivrit Meduberet]
 1948 – Between Calendars (novel), Keter, 1981 [Ben Ha-Sefirot], part of the Palmach trilogy
 The World Dictionary of Hebrew Slang, Part 2 (with Dahn Ben Amotz), Zmora Bitan, 1982 [Ha-Milon Le-Ivrit Meduberet II]
 Blessings and Curses (writings), Keter, 1984 [Brachot U-Klalot]
 Through the Binding Ropes (novel), Domino, 1985 [Mi-Bead L'Avotot], part of the Palmach trilogy
 Jerusalem from the Inside (novel), Edanim, 1988 [Yerushalayim Mi-Bifnocho]
 Autobiography in Poem and Song (folk songs), Keter, 1991 [Otobiografia Be-Shir U-Zemer]
 When the State of Israel Broke Out (novel), Keter, 1991 [Ke-She Partzah Ha-Medinah], part of the Palmach trilogy

References

External links
 Official website (in Hebrew)
  Jewish Virtual Library
 "Front line combat" audio essay by Ben-Yehuda at BBC online
 "Netiva Ben Yehuda" article in the Jewish Women's Encyclopedia by Yael Feldman

1928 births
2011 deaths
Jewish Israeli writers
Palmach members
Israeli Ashkenazi Jews
Ashkenazi Jews in Mandatory Palestine
Hebrew language
Jewish printing and publishing
Israeli women writers
Israeli women novelists
Israeli novelists
Israeli lexicographers
Bezalel Academy of Arts and Design alumni
Women in war in the Middle East
Women in warfare post-1945
Women lexicographers
20th-century novelists
20th-century women writers